Eremohadena is a genus of moths of the family Noctuidae.

Species
 Eremohadena adscripta (Püngeler, 1914)
 Eremohadena catalampra Ronkay, Varga & Gyulai, 2002
 Eremohadena chenopodiphaga (Rambur, 1832)
 Eremohadena coluteae (Bienert, 1869)
 Eremohadena eibinevoi Fibiger, Kravchenko, Li, Mooser & Müller, 2006
 Eremohadena halimi (Milliére, 1877)
 Eremohadena immunda (Eversmann, 1842)
 Eremohadena immunis (Staudinger, 1889)
 Eremohadena mariana (Lajonquiére, 1964)
 Eremohadena megaptera (Boursin, 1970)
 Eremohadena ochronota Gyulai & Ronkay, 2001
 Eremohadena orias (Ronkay & Varga, 1993)
 Eremohadena oxybela (Boursin, 1963)
 Eremohadena pexa (Staudinger, 1889)
 Eremohadena pugnax (Alphéraky, 1892)
 Eremohadena raja Ronkay, Varga & Gyulai, 2002
 Eremohadena rjabovi (Boursin, 1970)
 Eremohadena roseonitens (Oberthür, 1887)
 Eremohadena roseotinctoides (Poole, 1989)
 Eremohadena siri (Erschoff, 1874)
 Eremohadena toerpexa Ronkay & Gyulai, 2006

References
 Eremohadena at Markku Savela's Lepidoptera and Some Other Life Forms
 Natural History Museum Lepidoptera genus database

Xyleninae